Philodina acuticornis is a species of freshwater bdelloid rotifers.

References

Bdelloidea